Taeniogonalos raymenti is a species of wasp in the family Trigonalidae. It can be reared as a hyperparasite of the fly Sturmia convergens, itself a parasite of the monarch butterfly (Danaus plexippus).

References 

Parasitica
Hyperparasites